The Western Canada Concept Party of Saskatchewan was a provincial political party that was the Saskatchewan, Canada branch of the Western Canada Concept, a federal political party that advocated the separation of the four western provinces of Canada (British Columbia, Alberta, Saskatchewan, and Manitoba) to form a new country.

The party reached its peak during the 1982 provincial election, where the WCC won more votes than the Saskatchewan Liberal Party candidate in 23 of the province's 64 constituencies. In three ridings the WCC candidate captured more than 1,000 votes – in Moosomin, Souris-Cannington, and Shaunavon.

Two disgruntled PC MLA's, Lloyd Hampton and Bill Sveinson, later attempted to join the WCC, thus giving the party a presence in the Legislature. They were ultimately expelled from the WCC although the Legislature recognized them as WCC MLA's until the Legislature's dissolution. Hampton did not run again while Sveinson ran for a different party and finished a distant fourth.

See also
Unionest Party, a 1980s provincial party in Saskatchewan that advocated the province join the United States

References
Elections Saskatchewan: Provincial Vote Summaries
Saskatchewan Archives Board - Election Results By Electoral Division

Provincial political parties in Saskatchewan
Defunct secessionist organizations in Canada
Defunct political parties in Canada